TSTC Waco Airport  is a public use airport located eight nautical miles (9 mi, 15 km) northeast of the central business district of Waco, a city in McLennan County, Texas, United States. Before 1968, it was known as James Connally Air Force Base. The airport is owned by Texas State Technical College. It is included in the National Plan of Integrated Airport Systems for 2021–2025, which categorized it as a general aviation facility.

The facility is currently used as an industrial airpark operated by Texas State Technical College System for their aviation programs, and is noted for being the largest airport in the United States owned by an educational institution.

History

Military Use

The airport opened May 5, 1942, as Waco Army Air Field and was the headquarters of the Army Air Force Central Instructors' School during World War II.  It was deactivated after the war in 1945 but was reactivated in 1948 as a pilot training base under the Air Training Command. It was named for Colonel James T. Connally who had been killed in Japan in 1945. The airport was initially called Connally Air Force Base but the name evolved to also include his first name.

In 1957, the base became a support facility for the headquarters of Twelfth Air Force (12 AF) located in nearby Waco and concurrently concentrated on providing navigator flight training under the cognizance of the Air Training Command.

In 1968, as part of a nationwide reduction in air force bases and naval air stations to stay within congressional funding limits while continuing to prosecute the war in Vietnam, James Connally AFB was closed.  All navigator training consolidated at Mather Air Force Base, California, and 12th Air Force relocated to Bergstrom Air Force Base in Austin, Texas. At this point, the facility was conveyed to the State of Texas by the General Services Administration (GSA).

Civilian Use

The airport and the base facilities were used as a technical school while General Dynamics remained as a tenant performing modification work on various military aircraft. The General Dynamics facility was later closed.

Electrospace Systems opened a hangar at the facility; its operations were later sold to Chrysler and renamed Chrysler Technologies Airborne Systems. Chrysler subsequently sold the operation to Raytheon which renamed the facility Raytheon Aircraft Integration Systems. In 2002, Raytheon sold the facility to L-3 Communications and it is currently known as L-3 Communications Platform Integration Division.

During his presidency, George W. Bush flew in and out of the airport on Air Force One during visits to his home at the Prairie Chapel Ranch. On these trips, the president would typically fly on a Boeing VC-137 (until its retirement in 2001) or a C-32, due to the minimum runway length requirements of the primary presidential transport aircraft, the VC-25.

In 1991, TSTI was renamed Texas State Technical College (TSTC).

Facilities and aircraft 
TSTC Waco Airport covers an area of 2,200 acres (890 ha) at an elevation of 470 feet (143 m) above mean sea level. It has two runways: 17L/35R is 8,600 by 150 feet (2,621 x 46 m) with an asphalt surface; 17R/35L is 6,291 by 80 feet (1,917 x 23 m) with a concrete surface.

For the 12-month period ending August 21, 2010, the airport had 71,800 aircraft operations, an average of 196 per day: 76% general aviation and 24% military. At that time there were 11 aircraft based at this airport: 91% single-engine and 9% multi-engine.

See also 
 List of American Balloon Squadrons

References

External links

 Airport page at TSTC website
 Servion of Waco, the fixed-base operator (FBO)
  from Texas DOT Airport Directory
 Aerial image as of January 1995 from USGS The National Map
 
 

Airports in Texas
Buildings and structures in Waco, Texas
University and college airports
Transportation in McLennan County, Texas
1942 establishments in Texas
Airports established in 1942